Women + Country is singer-songwriter Jakob Dylan's second solo studio album. The album was released by Columbia Records on April 6, 2010, and produced by T-Bone Burnett.

Track listing

Personnel
 Jakob Dylan – guitar, vocals 
 T-Bone Burnett – bass, guitar, producer
 Neko Case – backing vocals
 Kelly Hogan – backing vocals
 Paul Ackling – equipment technician, guitar technician
 Jay Bellerose – drums, percussion
 George Bohanon – horn, trombone
 Christian Calabró – design
 Josh Cheuse – art direction, design
 Keefus Ciancia – keyboards
 Dennis Crouch – bass
 Emile Kelman – assistant engineer
 François Lardeau – engineer
 Greg Leisz – guitar, pedal steel
 Darrell Leonard – horn arrangements, trumpet
 Gavin Lurssen – mastering
 David Mansfield – banjo, fiddle, mandolin
 James Minchin III – photography
 Jessica C. Mitchell – assistant
 Ira Nepus – trombone
 Mike Piersante – engineer, mixing
 Marc Ribot – guitar
 Ivy Skoff – production coordination
 Maurice Spears – trombone
 Jason Wormer – editing, engineer

Charts

References

2010 albums
Albums produced by T Bone Burnett
Columbia Records albums
Jakob Dylan albums
Alternative country albums by American artists